Karl Coryat is an American writer, comedian, and musician.

Jeopardy! contestant
In 1996, he was a two-day champion on the television game show Jeopardy!. Subsequently, he wrote an online article with advice for prospective Jeopardy! contestants, which included a method to play along at home, keep score, and gauge one's performance. Enthusiasts of the show call this the "Coryat score".

Music career
As an early member of the Immersion Composition Society, Coryat is the co-author (along with Nicholas Dobson) of The Frustrated Songwriter's Handbook, which details the method that ICS members use to write a large number of songs quickly. Tim Rice-Oxley used the method to write songs for the Keane album Strangeland, and Jez Williams, guitarist for British band Doves, has cited the book as inspiration for their 2009 album Kingdom of Rust. Coryat also wrote Guerrilla Home Recording and edited The Bass Player Book (all published by Hal Leonard Corporation). As a music journalist, he has interviewed Prince, Sting, Geddy Lee, Flea, Brian Wilson, Les Claypool, and others for Bass Player magazine.

As a multi-instrumentalist musician (vocals, bass, guitar, drums, and keyboards), he has been recording music under the name Eddie Current since the 1980s.

Other pursuits
Coryat's essay "Toward an Informational Mechanics" was awarded a Judging Panel Discretionary Prize in the 2012 physics essay competition sponsored by the Foundational Questions Institute and Scientific American magazine. Drawing on work by John Archibald Wheeler, Carlo Rovelli, and Bob Coecke, the essay calls for a generalization of quantum mechanics that incorporates informational legacy or context into quantum measurements, which might ultimately lead to a description of an "it from bit" universe with the least possible complexity. He has produced video essays on how the biocentric universe theory of Robert Lanza may be the best route to this.

As a comedian under the pseudonym Edward Current, he makes YouTube satires of religious fundamentalism and politics, as well as serious videos demonstrating physics and criticizing the 9/11 Truth movement.

Personal life
Coryat attended Brunswick School and the University of California, Berkeley. He lives in Arkansas.

Bibliography

References

American male writers
American male comedians
21st-century American comedians
American male musicians
American multi-instrumentalists
Jeopardy! contestants
1965 births
Living people
University of California, Berkeley alumni
Place of birth missing (living people)
Writers from California
Musicians from California